The Fifth Oklahoma Legislature was a meeting of the legislative branch of the government of Oklahoma, composed of the Oklahoma Senate and the Oklahoma House of Representatives. The state legislature met in Oklahoma City, in regular session from January 5 to March 23, 1915, and in special session from January 17 to February 22, 1916, during the first two years of the term of Governor Robert L. Williams. The legislature included six Socialists, who only served for a single term. The only bill sponsored by a Socialist that became Oklahoma law involved hunting. The 1916 special session was called after the U.S. Supreme Court struck down Oklahoma's Jim Crow law.

Lieutenant Governor Martin E. Trapp served as the President of the Senate and E. L. Mitchell served as the President pro tempore of the Oklahoma Senate. A. A. McCrory served as Speaker of the Oklahoma House of Representatives.

Dates of sessions
Regular session: January 5-March 23, 1915
Special session: January 17-February 22, 1916
Previous: 4th Legislature • Next: 6th Legislature

Party composition

Senate

House of Representatives

Leadership

Senate
Lieutenant Governor Martin E. Trapp served as the President of the Senate, which gave him a tie-breaking vote and allowed him to serve as a presiding officer. E. L. Mitchell was elected by state senators to serve as the President pro tempore of the Oklahoma Senate, the primary presiding officer of the Oklahoma Senate.

House
A. A. McCrory of Ringling, Oklahoma, served as Speaker of the Oklahoma House of Representatives and William A. Durant served as Speaker Pro Tempore.

Members

Senate

Table based on state almanac.

House of Representatives

Table based on government database.

References

External links
Oklahoma Legislature
Oklahoma House of Representatives
Oklahoma Senate

Oklahoma legislative sessions
1915 in Oklahoma
1916 in Oklahoma
1915 U.S. legislative sessions
1916 U.S. legislative sessions